Grefsenåsen is a hill in Lillomarka in Oslo, Norway. The height is 377 meter.

The view from the top is magnificent, and the hill has for a long time been a popular resort for day-trippers living in Oslo. A restaurant was built on the top in 1927, and this is still in use.

The name
The hill is named after the old farm of Grefsen, the last element is the finite form of ås m 'mountain ridge'.

Landforms of Oslo
Hills of Norway